Local elections were held for Kollam Municipal Corporation in Kollam, Kerala, India in 2005.

Winning candidates

References

2005 elections in India
Local elections in Kerala 
Kollam
Government of Kollam
2000s in Kerala